Ulendo Airlink offer both scheduled and non-scheduled commercial air services from their base at Kamuzu International Airport in Lilongwe, Malawi. The company began operations in 2011, and provides services throughout Malawi and the region. The airline currently operates a fleet of six aircraft.

Destinations

Ulendo Airlink operates scheduled flights under the IATA designator W4 as well as unscheduled flight services primarily for the safari and NGO markets to major and remote airstrips in Malawi, and also conducts operations to Mfuwe, Zambia from Kamuzu International Airport on a daily basis. It serves the following destinations:

 Likoma Island
 Club Makokola
 Liwonde National Park
 Nyika Plateau
 Blantyre
 Monkey Bay
 Majete Wildlife Reserve
 Mzuzu
 Tongole
 Karonga

 Mfuwe

Fleet 
, The airline has a fleet consisting of Cessna and Dornier 228  aircraft.

References

External links

 http://www.flyulendo.com/

Airlines of Malawi
2011 establishments in Malawi
Airlines established in 2011
Lilongwe